Acacia centrinervia, commonly known as hairy white wattle, is a shrub belonging to the genus Acacia and the subgenus Phyllodineae that is native to parts of eastern Australia.

Description
It flowers in the springtime between August and November producing single inflorescences that are found in the axil of the phyllodes. The spherical flower-heads with a diameter of around  contain 20 bright yellow flowers.

Taxonomy
The species was first formally described by the botanists Joseph Maiden and William Blakely in 1927 as published in Journal and Proceedings of the Royal Society of New South Wales. It was reclassified as Racosperma centrinervium by Leslie Pedley in 1987 then transferred back to the genus Acacia in 2006. It is very closely related to Acacia lineata.

Distribution
The shrub is found in two disjunct populations, one around Parkes in New South Wales and the other near the Queensland - New South Wales border.

See also
 List of Acacia species

References

centrinervia
Flora of New South Wales
Flora of Queensland
Plants described in 1927
Taxa named by Joseph Maiden
Taxa named by William Blakely